The 1909–10 Lancashire Cup was the fifth year of this regional rugby league competition and for the first time the defending champions retained the trophy as Wigan beat Leigh in the final at Wheater's Field, Broughton, Salford,  by 22-5. The attendance at the final was 14,000 and receipts £296.

Background 
For the third year there were 12 teams participating in the competitions so four clubs were awarded byes in the first round.

Fixtures and results

Round 1  
Involved  4 matches (with four byes) and 12 clubs

Round 2 – quarterfinals

Round 3 – semifinals

Final

Teams and scorers  

Scoring - Try = three (3) points - Goal = two (2) points - Drop goal = two (2) points

The road to success

Notes and comments 
1 The first time St Helens had won a game in the competition
2 Wheater's Field was the home ground of Broughton Rangers with a capacity of 20,000
3  Joe Millar was the first player to score more than one try in the final

See also 
1909–10 Northern Rugby Football Union season

References

RFL Lancashire Cup
Lancashire Cup